Xiangqiao District is a district under the administration of Chaozhou city, in Guangdong province of the People's Republic of China.  Its name comes from the ancient Xiangzi Bridge that once lay in its territory. The total area of the district is 176 square kilometers, and its population in 2003 was 343,500 people. 78,800 of these people are farmers, while 264,600 are not. The government of Xiangqiao district is located in the Fucheng area of Chaozhou, and the district has a long history and a rich culture.

References 

County-level divisions of Guangdong
Chaozhou